Juozapinė Hill is a hill located near Vilnius, formerly regarded as the highest point in Lithuania. Its elevation is 292.7metres (957 feet); its latitude and longitude are 54.4667/25.5667. The status of the highest elevation in Lithuania is now being attributed to Aukštojas Hill (293,84 m). Juozapinė Hill is in fact only the third highest elevation in Lithuania, the second being Kruopinė (Žybartonys) Hill (293,65 m) situated approximately 10 km west of Juozapinė Hill.

External links 
  Which are the highest hills in Lithuania? (in Lithuanian) - a note by Rimantas Krupickas, a Lithuanian geographer, on the recent measurements of the highest elevations in Lithuania

Hills of Lithuania